Sweet Sugar is a 1972 women in prison exploitation film directed by Michel Levesque and starring Phyllis Davis. It is about a woman sentenced to work on a chain gang.

Plot
Sugar Bowman agrees to serve two years working on a sugar-cane plantation rather than go to jail on a trumped-up drug charge. She arrives with new inmate Simone and encounters brutal guard Burgos and a maniacal plantation owner known only as Dr. John.

Along with using a machete in the field to cut cane sugar all day, Sugar and the other inmates are forced to undergo Dr. John's medical experiments, who is testing drugs. He also rapes the 17-year-old prisoner, Dolores. After being caught in an intimate situation with Carlos, a guard, Sugar is to be whipped, but when Carlos refuses, he is shot by Burgos.

The female inmates attempt to hide and protect Mojo, Simone's love interest who has vague voodoo powers, but the Burgos catches him and Dr. John burns him at the stake. After setting fire to the sugar cane fields and stealing guns and vehicles, Sugar, Simone, and Dolores team-up with two more guards to take Dr. John hostage and attempt to escape. While fleeing, Simone is shot and crashes her jeep with Dr. John. He maniacally claims to be immortal, to which she responds by shooting him and blowing up the jeep, killing them both and blocking the exit so the rest can escape in a truck. After ditching the two guards who helped her, the final shot is Sugar walking down a street in town with two men, apparently making good her escape.

Cast
Phyllis Davis as Sugar Bowman
Ella Edwards as Simone
Timothy Brown as Mojo 
Pamela Collins as Dolores
Cliff Osmond as Burgos
Angus Duncan as Dr. John
Jackie Giroux as Fara Ramirez
Darl Severns as Carlos
Albert Cole as Max
James Houghton as Rick
James Whitworth as Mario

Reception 
The film was given 1/4 stars by film critic Roger Ebert.

See also
 List of American films of 1972

References

External links

Sweet Sugar at TCMDB

1970s exploitation films
1972 films
Women in prison films
Dimension Pictures films
1970s English-language films
American exploitation films
American prison films
1970s American films